Lipotriches edirisinghei is a species of bee in the genus Lipotriches, of the family Halictidae.

References

External links 
 http://animaldiversity.org/accounts/Lipotriches_edirisinghei/classification/
 https://www.itis.gov/servlet/SingleRpt/SingleRpt?search_topic=TSN&search_value=764289
 https://web.archive.org/web/20150210084246/http://halictidae.lifedesks.org/pages/29223
 https://www.gbif.org/species/1352312

Halictidae
Insects described in 2006